Hereditary sensory neuropathy, type IB is a protein that in humans is encoded by the HSN1B gene.

References